Naureen Marie Zaim (born February 19, 1978) is an American model, actress, artist, and boxer.

Biography 
She is of mixed Irish and Pakistani descent. Her acting career includes roles in Wedding Crashers, and athletic performances in Perfect 10 Model Boxing. In mid-2004, Zaim was scouted by a photographer for 'model boxing' company Perfect 10 Model – a boxing competition for women with 'admirable' breasts. Although known for modeling, boxing, and acting, Naureen also holds two degrees in Fine Art for painting and glass-blowing. Her athleticism also transcends boxing to include fast-pitch softball, tennis, and pool.

She has appeared in several publications, including Maxim, Stuff Magazine, Thirteen Minutes Magazine, and Perfect 10 magazine.

Filmography

References

External links

Official site

AskMen.com – Most Desirable Women of 2007
GotCast.com

1978 births
Living people
Actresses from California
Actresses from Chicago
American artists of Pakistani descent
American film actors of Pakistani descent
American film actresses
American models of Pakistani descent
American people of Irish descent
American women boxers
American women painters
Boxers from California
Boxers from Illinois
Female models from California
Female models from Illinois
20th-century American painters
20th-century American women artists
21st-century American actresses
21st-century American painters
21st-century American women artists